Komma may refer to:

 the Greek comma, when distinguishing it or its historical forms from the Latin comma
 Komma (alga), a genus of algae
 Karl Komma (1913-2012) German composer